Thomas Allis  (9 January 1788 – 24 September 1875) was a British osteologist and museum curator.

Career
Allis was educated at Burford and married Mary Naish of Flax Burton in 1812, before going to York in 1823. He was appointed Superintendent of 'The Retreat', a private asylum in York; a position he kept until 1842 where he left to work in a similar position in Osbaldwick. Alongside his profession he studied ornithology and osteology.

Allis held two Honorary Curatorships at the Yorkshire Museum from 1835 to 1875, was elected as a Fellow of the Linnean Society in 1857 and was one of the first members of the British Association. He was Honorary Curator of Ornithology from 1835 to 1839 before succeeding James Atkinson, following his death in 1839, in the post of Honorary Curator of Comparative Anatomy - a position Allis held from 1839 until his death in 1875. Allis also served as vice-president of the YPS.

A collection of comparative anatomy was purchased from Allis by the Yorkshire Philosophical Society in 1838 for £350.

Personal life

Allis had a son, Thomas Henry Allis, who was described as "assiduous collector of Lepidoptera", The son died in August 1870, five years before Thomas Allis senior. Both are buried at the Friend's Burial Ground, York.

Select publications
Allis, T. 1832. 'On Certain peculiarities of the bony fabric of the Ostrich, Emu, and Swift, Annual Report of the Yorkshire Philosophical Society
Allis, T. 1837. 'On the Sclerotic Bones forming the Orbit of the Eye in different Bird and Reptiles', Report of the British Association
Allis, T. 1865. 'Further Note on a Skeleton of Dinornis robustus, Owen, in the York Museum', Journal of the Proceedings of the Linnean Society of London 8 (11-12), 140–141.
Allis, T. 1873. 'On the Skeleton of the Apteryx', Zoological Journal of the Linnean Society 11 (56), 523.

References

External links
Papers relating to Thomas Allis at the Wellcome library

1788 births
1875 deaths
British curators
Fellows of the Linnean Society of London
People from Tewkesbury
Yorkshire Museum people
Members of the Yorkshire Philosophical Society